The battle of Marstrand was a successful Dano-Norwegian siege of the harbor town of Marstrand, Sweden which took place between 6–23 July 1677, during the Scanian War.

Prelude
In January 1677, a strong point in Strömstad was taken by a Swedish force. After a fiercely cold winter struck, no military movements took place until June, when Ulrik Frederik Gyldenløve sent 2,000 men under the command of general Hans Løvenhjelm across the border to Bohuslän to retake Strömstad. After doing this Løvenhielm proceeded to Uddevalla. Simultaneously, Gyldenløve shipped out a considerable force (1,600 men according to Danish sources, 3,000 according to Swedish sources) in the direction of Marstrand. He landed on the neighboring island of Koön on 6 July and began besieging the town.

Development

Marstrand was defended by the fortress of Carlsten and the three strong-points Malepert (on the east side of the northern harbour inlet), Gustafsborg (by the southern harbour inlet), and Hedvigsholm (on a skerry located in the harbour itself). The defenders tallied 600, led by commander (kommendant) Anders Sinclair. When demanded to evacuate the fortress, Sinclair replied "...there was no fortress to yield, but if the enemy would like to visit, there would be a fine welcoming party."

The Danes attacked Hedvigsholm first; after withstanding several attacks, the Swedes defending it were forced to abandon it and retire to Carlsten on 20 July. Malepert had been taken already on 13 July and Gustafsberg was abandoned soon thereafter. Carlsten no longer had outposts, and after strong bombardment from all sides, finally surrendered on 23 July, with the condition that the commander along with his men would be sent to Värmland.

Aftermath 
After taking Carlsten, Gyldenløve installed a strong detachment of troops under Løvenhjelm to defend Marstrand before returning to Norway. Through the conquest of Marstrand Denmark obtained a safe, ice-free harbour. This in turn further enabled the Danish blockade of Gothenburg. However, Løvenhjelm soon found himself threatened by approaching Swedish forces, and retired with his men to Strömstad in August.

References

 Berättelser ur svenska historien, vol 6, p 685, Carl Georg Starbäck & Per Olof Bäckström (1886)
 Dansk biografisk lexikon, vol 10, p 597, Carl Frederik Bricka (1905)

Marstrand
Marstrand
1677 in Denmark
History of Bohuslän
Marstrand
Marstrand
Marstrand